The 2016 Philadelphia Phillies season was the 134th season in the history of the franchise, and its 13th season at Citizens Bank Park. They improved upon their 63–99 (.389) mark from the year before and finished with a record of 71–91 (.438) and fourth place in the National League East. They missed the playoffs for the fifth consecutive season.

Offseason

Arrivals

Season standings

National League East

National League Wild Card

Record vs. opponents

Game log

|- style="background:#fbb"
| 1 || April 4 || @ Reds || 2–6 || Ross Ohlendorf (1–0) || David Hernandez (0–1) || — || 43,683 || 0–1
|- style="background:#fbb"
| 2 || April 6 || @ Reds || 2–3 || Blake Wood (1–0) || Dalier Hinojosa (0–1) || — || 21,621 || 0–2
|- style="background:#fbb"
| 3 || April 7 || @ Reds || 6–10 || Robert Stephenson (1–0) || Charlie Morton (0–1) || — || 10,784 || 0–3
|- style="background:#fbb"
| 4 || April 8 || @ Mets || 2–7 || Jacob deGrom (1–0) || Jerad Eickhoff (0–1) || — || 44,099 || 0–4
|- style="background:#bfb"
| 5 || April 9 || @ Mets || 1–0 || Vince Velasquez (1–0) || Bartolo Colón (0–1) || Jeanmar Gómez (1) || 37,083 || 1–4
|- style="background:#bfb"
| 6 || April 10 || @ Mets || 5–2 || Jeremy Hellickson (1–0) || Matt Harvey (0–2) || Jeanmar Gómez (2) || 37,233 || 2–4
|- style="background:#fbb"
| 7 || April 11 || Padres || 3–4 || Kevin Quackenbush (1–0) || Aaron Nola (0–1) || Fernando Rodney (1) || 45,229 || 2–5
|- style="background:#bfb"
| 8 || April 12 || Padres || 3–0 || Charlie Morton (1–1) || Robbie Erlin (1–1) || Jeanmar Gómez (3) || 21,043 || 3–5
|- style="background:#bfb"
| 9 || April 13 || Padres || 2–1 || Jerad Eickhoff (1–1) || Colin Rea (0–1) || Jeanmar Gómez (4) || 17,638 || 4–5
|- style="background:#bfb"
| 10 || April 14 || Padres || 3–0 || Vince Velasquez (2–0) || Drew Pomeranz (1–1) || — || 18,079 || 5–5
|- style="background:#fbb"
| 11 || April 15 || Nationals || 1–9 || Joe Ross (2–0) || Jeremy Hellickson (1–1) || — || 22,624 || 5–6
|- style="background:#fbb"
| 12 || April 16 || Nationals || 1–8 || Max Scherzer (2–0) || Aaron Nola (0–2) || — || 30,320 || 5–7
|- style="background:#bfb"
| 13 || April 17 || Nationals || 3–2 (10) || Jeanmar Gómez (1–0) || Jonathan Papelbon (0–1) || — || 37,378 || 6–7
|- style="background:#fbb"
| 14 || April 18 || Mets || 2–5 || Noah Syndergaard (2–0) || Jerad Eickhoff (1–2) || — || 21,585 || 6–8
|- style="background:#fbb"
| 15 || April 19 || Mets || 1–11 || Logan Verrett (1–0) || Vince Velasquez (2–1) || — || 22,417 || 6–9
|- style="background:#bfb"
| 16 || April 20 || Mets || 5–4 (11) || Jeanmar Gómez (2–0) || Hansel Robles (0–1) || — || 20,057 || 7–9
|- style="background:#bfb"
| 17 || April 22 || @ Brewers || 5–2 || Aaron Nola (1–2) || Zach Davies (0–2) || — || 23,439 || 8–9
|- style="background:#bfb"
| 18 || April 23 || @ Brewers || 10–6 || Brett Oberholtzer (1–0) || Chase Anderson (1–2) || — || 34,813 || 9–9
|- style="background:#fbb"
| 19 || April 24 || @ Brewers || 5–8 || Wily Peralta (1–3) || Jerad Eickhoff (1–3) || Jeremy Jeffress (6) || 28,131 || 9–10
|- style="background:#bfb"
| 20 || April 26 || @ Nationals || 4–3 || Vince Velasquez (3–1) || Óliver Pérez (1–1) || Jeanmar Gómez (5) || 25,097 || 10–10
|- style="background:#bfb"
| 21 || April 27 || @ Nationals || 3–0 || Jeremy Hellickson (2–1) || Gio González (1–1) || Jeanmar Gómez (6) || 24,186 || 11–10
|- style="background:#bfb"
| 22 || April 28 || @ Nationals || 3–0 || Elvis Araújo (1–0) || Felipe Rivero (0–1)  || Jeanmar Gómez (7) || 22,112 || 12–10
|- style="background:#bfb"
| 23 || April 29 || Indians || 4–3 (11) || David Hernandez (1–1) || Cody Allen (0–3) || — || 18,677 || 13–10
|- style="background:#bfb"
| 24 || April 30 || Indians || 4–3 || Andrew Bailey (1–0) || Tommy Hunter (0–1) || Jeanmar Gómez (8) || 23,363 || 14–10
|-

|- style="background:#bfb"
| 25 || May 1 || Indians || 2–1 || Vince Velasquez (4–1) || Danny Salazar (2–2) || Héctor Neris (1) || 23,809 || 15–10
|- style="background:#fbb"
| 26 || May 2 || @ Cardinals || 3–10 || Adam Wainwright (2–3) || Jeremy Hellickson (2–2) || — || 40,438 || 15–11
|- style="background:#bfb"
| 27 || May 3 || @ Cardinals || 1–0 || Aaron Nola (2–2) || Michael Wacha (2–2) || Jeanmar Gómez (9) || 40,087 || 16–11
|- style="background:#fbb"
| 28 || May 4 || @ Cardinals || 4–5 || Kevin Siegrist (4–0) || Jeanmar Gómez (2–1) || — || 40,725 || 16–12
|- style="background:#fbb"
| 29 || May 5 || @ Cardinals || 0–4 || Jaime García (2–2) || Jerad Eickhoff (1–4) || — || 41,818 || 16–13
|- style="background:#fbb"
| 30 || May 6 || @ Marlins || 4–6 || Kyle Barraclough (2–0) || Héctor Neris (0–1) || David Phelps (2) || 19,983 || 16–14
|- style="background:#bfb"
| 31 || May 7 || @ Marlins || 4–3 || Brett Oberholtzer (2–0) || Craig Breslow (0–2) || Jeanmar Gómez (10) || 21,719 || 17–14
|- style="background:#bfb"
| 32 || May 8 || @ Marlins || 6–5 || Héctor Neris (1–1) || David Phelps (2–2) || Jeanmar Gómez (11) || 19,625 || 18–14
|- style="background:#bfb"
| 33 || May 10 || @ Braves || 3–2 || Adam Morgan (1–0) || Matt Wisler (1–3) || Jeanmar Gómez (12) || 14,490 || 19–14
|- style="background:#fbb"
| 34 || May 11 || @ Braves || 1–5 || Williams Pérez (1–0) || Jerad Eickhoff (1–5) || — || 13,760 || 19–15
|- style="background:#bfb"
| 35 || May 12 || @ Braves || 7–4 (10) || Andrew Bailey (2–0) || Jason Grilli (1–2) || Jeanmar Gómez (13) || 15,643 || 20–15
|- style="background:#bfb"
| 36 || May 13 || Reds || 3–2 || Jeremy Hellickson (3–2) || Brandon Finnegan (1–2) || Jeanmar Gómez (14) || 22,230 || 21–15
|- style="background:#bfb"
| 37 || May 14 || Reds || 4–3 || Aaron Nola (3–2) || Tim Adleman (1–1) || David Hernandez (1) || 29,535 || 22–15
|- style="background:#fbb"
| 38 || May 15 || Reds || 4–9 || Dan Straily (2–1) || Adam Morgan (1–1) || Tony Cingrani (3) || 27,869 || 22–16
|- style="background:#fbb"
| 39 || May 16 || Marlins || 3–5 || Adam Conley (3–2) || Jerad Eickhoff (1–6) || A. J. Ramos (12) || 28,348 || 22–17
|- style="background:#bfb"
| 40 || May 17 || Marlins || 3–1 || Vince Velasquez (5–1) || Wei-Yin Chen (3–2) || Jeanmar Gómez (15) || 18,240 || 23–17
|- style="background:#bfb"
| 41 || May 18 || Marlins || 4–2 || Jeremy Hellickson (4–2) || Tom Koehler (2–4) || Jeanmar Gómez (16) || 29,579 || 24–17
|- style="background:#fbb"
| 42 || May 20 || Braves || 1–7 || Matt Wisler (2–3) || Aaron Nola (3–3) || — || 27,257 || 24–18
|- style="background:#fbb"
| 43 || May 21 || Braves || 0–2 || Williams Pérez (2–1) || Adam Morgan (1–2) || Arodys Vizcaíno (5) || 20,196 || 24–19
|- style="background:#bfb"
| 44 || May 22 || Braves || 5–0 || Jerad Eickhoff (2–6) || Casey Kelly (0–1) || — || 23,367 || 25–19
|- style="background:#fbb"
| 45 || May 23 || @ Tigers || 4–5 || Justin Wilson (1–1) || Colton Murray (0–1) || Francisco Rodríguez (13) || 26,400 || 25–20
|- style="background:#fbb"
| 46 || May 24 || @ Tigers || 3–1 || Justin Verlander (4–4) || Jeremy Hellickson (4–3) || Francisco Rodríguez (14) || 26,531 || 25–21
|- style="background:#bfb"
| 47 || May 25 || @ Tigers || 8–5 || Aaron Nola (4–3) || Aníbal Sánchez (3–6) || Jeanmar Gómez (17) || 31,187 || 26–21
|- style="background:#fbb"
| 48 || May 27 || @ Cubs || 2–6 || Jon Lester (5–3) || Adam Morgan (1–3) || — || 38,941 || 26–22
|- style="background:#fbb"
| 49 || May 28 || @ Cubs || 1–4 || Kyle Hendricks (3–4) || Jerad Eickhoff (2–7) || — || 41,555 || 26–23
|- style="background:#fbb"
| 50 || May 29 || @ Cubs || 2–7 || John Lackey (5–2) || Vince Velasquez (5–2) || — || 41,575 || 26–24
|- style="background:#fbb"
| 51 || May 30 || Nationals || 3–4 || Tanner Roark (4–4) || Héctor Neris (1–2) || Jonathan Papelbon (14) || 21,993 || 26–25
|- style="background:#fbb"
| 52 || May 31 || Nationals || 1–5 || Joe Ross (5–4) || Aaron Nola (4–4) ||  — || 18,572 || 26–26 
|-

|- style="background:#fbb"
| 53 || June 1 || Nationals || 2–7 || Max Scherzer (6–4) || Adam Morgan (1–4) || — || 19,052 || 26–27 
|- style="background:#fbb"
| 54 || June 2 || Brewers || 1–4 || Chase Anderson (3–6) || Jerad Eickhoff (2–8) || Jeremy Jeffress (14) || 22,890 || 26–28
|- style="background:#bfb"
| 55 || June 3 || Brewers || 6–3 || Andrew Bailey (3–0) || Jimmy Nelson (5–4) || Jeanmar Gómez (18) || 20,138 || 27–28
|- style="background:#fbb"
| 56 || June 4 || Brewers || 3–6 || Will Smith (1–0) || Héctor Neris (1–3) || Jeremy Jeffress (15) || 25,177 || 27–29
|- style="background:#bfb"
| 57 || June 5 || Brewers || 8–1 || Aaron Nola (5–4) || Wily Peralta (3–7) || — || 24,259 || 28–29
|- style="background:#fbb"
| 58 || June 6 || Cubs || 4–6 || Jon Lester (7–3) || Adam Morgan (1–5) || Héctor Rondón (11)|| 22,162 || 28–30
|- style="background:#bfb"
| 59 || June 7 || Cubs || 3–2 || Jerad Eickhoff (3–8) || Kyle Hendricks (4–5) || Jeanmar Gómez (19) || 27,381 || 29–30
|- style="background:#fbb"
| 60 || June 8 || Cubs || 1–8 || John Lackey (7–2) || Brett Oberholtzer (2–1) || — || 28,650 || 29–31
|- style="background:#fbb"
| 61 || June 10 || @ Nationals || 6–9 || Stephen Strasburg (10–0) || Jeremy Hellickson (4–4) || Jonathan Papelbon (16) || 37,941 || 29–32
|- style="background:#fbb"
| 62 || June 11 || @ Nationals || 0–8 || Tanner Roark (5–4) || Aaron Nola (5–5) || — || 38,044 || 29–33
|- style="background:#fbb"
| 63 || June 12 || @ Nationals || 4–5 || Jonathan Papelbon (1–2) || Jeanmar Gómez (2–2) || — || 34,294 || 29–34
|- style="background:#bfb"
| 64 || June 13 || @ Blue Jays || 7–0 || Jerad Eickhoff (4–8) || R. A. Dickey (4–7) || — || 35,578 || 30–34
|- style="background:#fbb"
| 65 || June 14 || @ Blue Jays || 3–11 || Marcus Stroman (6–2) || Zach Eflin (0–1) || — || 47,066 || 30–35
|- style="background:#fbb"
| 66 || June 15 || Blue Jays || 3–7 || Marco Estrada (5–2) || Jeremy Hellickson (4–5) || — || 24,753 || 30–36
|- style="background:#fbb"
| 67 || June 16 || Blue Jays || 2–13 || J. A. Happ (8–3) || Aaron Nola (5–6) || — || 22,279 || 30–37
|- style="background:#fbb"
| 68 || June 17 || Diamondbacks || 2–10 || Robbie Ray (4–5) || Adam Morgan (1–6) || — || 19,282 || 30–38
|- style="background:#fbb"
| 69 || June 18 || Diamondbacks || 1–4 || Zack Greinke (10–3) || Jerad Eickhoff (4–9) || Brad Ziegler (14) || 33,797 || 30–39
|- style="background:#fbb"
| 70 || June 19 || Diamondbacks || 1–5 || Archie Bradley (3–3) || Zach Eflin (0–2) || — || 40,214 || 30–40
|- style="background:#fbb"
| 71 || June 20 || Diamondbacks || 1–3 || Shelby Miller (2–6) || Jeremy Hellickson (4–6) || Brad Ziegler (15) || 22,118 || 30–41
|- style="background:#fbb"
| 72 || June 21 || @ Twins || 10–14 || Buddy Boshers (2–0) || Aaron Nola (5–7) || Brandon Kintzler (3) || 25,714 || 30–42
|- style="background:#fbb"
| 73 || June 22 || @ Twins || 5–6 || Taylor Rogers (3–0) || David Hernandez (1–2) || Fernando Abad (1) || 25,032 || 30–43
|- style="background:#bfb"
| 74 || June 23 || @ Twins || 7–3 || Jerad Eickhoff (5–9) || Ricky Nolasco (3–5) || — || 30,012 || 31–43
|- style="background:#fbb"
| 75 || June 24 || @ Giants || 4–5 || Jake Peavy (4–6) || Elvis Araújo (1–1) || Santiago Casilla (17) || 42,238 || 31–44
|- style="background:#bfb"
| 76 || June 25 || @ Giants || 3–2 || Jeremy Hellickson (5–6) || Madison Bumgarner (8–4) || Jeanmar Gómez (20) || 41,928 || 32–44
|- style="background:#fbb"
| 77 || June 26 || @ Giants || 7–8 || Cory Gearrin (3–0) || Severino González (0–1) || — || 41,479 || 32–45
|- style="background:#bfb"
| 78 || June 27 || @ Diamondbacks || 8–0 || Vince Velasquez (6–2) || Robbie Ray (4–7) || — || 22,567 || 33–45
|- style="background:#bfb"
| 79 || June 28 || @ Diamondbacks || 4–3 || Héctor Neris (2–3) || Brad Ziegler (2–3) || Jeanmar Gómez (21) || 19,645 || 34–45
|- style="background:#bfb"
| 80 || June 29 || @ Diamondbacks || 9–8 (10) || Jeanmar Gómez (3–2)  || Silvino Bracho (0–2) || Brett Oberholtzer (1) || 18,603 || 35–45
|-

|- style="background:#bfb"
| 81 || July 1 || Royals || 4–3 || Jeremy Hellickson (6–6) || Ian Kennedy (6–7) || Jeanmar Gómez (22) || 30,263 || 36–45
|- style="background:#fbb"
| 82 || July 2 || Royals || 2–6 || Danny Duffy (4–1) || Aaron Nola (5–8) || — || 40,331 || 36–46
|- style="background:#bfb"
| 83 || July 3 || Royals || 7–2 || Vince Velasquez (7–2) || Yordano Ventura (6–6) || — || 20,473 || 37–46
|- style="background:#bfb"
| 84 || July 4 || Braves || 8–2 || Jerad Eickhoff (6–9) || Joel De La Cruz (0–2) || — || 19,064 || 38–46
|- style="background:#bfb"
| 85 || July 5 || Braves || 5–1 || Zach Eflin (1–2) || Mike Foltynewicz (2–3) || — || 18,426 || 39–46
|- style="background:#bfb"
| 86 || July 6 || Braves || 4–3 || Héctor Neris (3–3) || Arodys Vizcaíno (1–4) || Jeanmar Gómez (23) || 19,211 || 40–46
|- style="background:#fbb"
| 87 || July 7 || @ Rockies || 2–11 || Chad Bettis (7–6) || Adam Morgan (1–7) || — || 35,250 || 40–47
|- style="background:#bfb"
| 88 || July 8 || @ Rockies || 5–3 || Vince Velasquez (8–2) || Jake McGee (0–3) || Jeanmar Gómez (24) || 42,335 || 41–47
|- style="background:#fbb"
| 89 || July 9 || @ Rockies || 3–8 || Tyler Anderson (1–3) || Jerad Eickhoff (6–10) || Jordan Lyles (1) || 48,105 || 41–48
|- style="background:#bfb"
| 90 || July 10 || @ Rockies || 10–3 || Zach Eflin (2–2) || Tyler Chatwood (8–5) || — || 32,113 || 42–48
|- style="background:#bbcaff;"
| — || July 12 ||colspan="7" |2016 Major League Baseball All-Star Game at Petco Park in San Diego
|- style="background:#fbb"
| 91 || July 15 || Mets || 3–5 || Bartolo Colón (8–4) || Jeremy Hellickson (6–7) || Jeurys Familia (32) || 28,076 || 42–49
|- style="background:#bfb"
| 92 || July 16 || Mets || 4–2 || Edubray Ramos (1–0) || Jerry Blevins (3–1) || Jeanmar Gómez (25) || 37,324 || 43–49
|- style="background:#fbb"
| 93 || July 17 || Mets || 0–5 || Jacob deGrom (6–4) || Zach Eflin (2–3) || — || 30,894 || 43–50
|- style="background:#fbb"
| 94 || July 18 || Marlins || 2–3 (11) || Kyle Barraclough (6–2) || Brett Oberholtzer (2–2) || A. J. Ramos (30) || 19,115 || 43–51
|- style="background:#fbb"
| 95 || July 19 || Marlins || 1–2 (10) || Mike Dunn (2–1) || David Hernandez (1–3) || A. J. Ramos (31) || 18,347 || 43–52
|- style="background:#bfb"
| 96 || July 20 || Marlins || 4–1 || Jeremy Hellickson (7–7) || Wei-Yin Chen (5–4) || Jeanmar Gómez (26) || 20,654 || 44–52
|- style="background:#fbb"
| 97 || July 21 || Marlins || 3–9 || Tom Koehler (7–8) || Jerad Eickhoff (6–11) || — || 27,839 || 44–53
|- style="background:#bfb"
| 98 || July 22 || @ Pirates || 4–0 || Zach Eflin (3–3) || Gerrit Cole (5–6) || — || 33,703 || 45–53
|- style="background:#fbb"
| 99 || July 23 || @ Pirates || 4–7 || Juan Nicasio (8–6) || Aaron Nola (5–9) || Mark Melancon (29) || 35,802 ||  45–54
|- style="background:#fbb"
| 100 || July 24 || @ Pirates || 4–5 || Neftalí Feliz (4–0) || Edubray Ramos (1–1) || Mark Melancon (30) || 32,439 || 45–55
|- style="background:#bfb"
| 101 || July 25 || @ Marlins || 4–0 || David Hernandez (2–3) || Fernando Rodney (1–3) || — || 19,465 || 46–55
|- style="background:#fbb"
| 102 || July 26 || @ Marlins || 0–5 || Tom Koehler (8–8) || Jerad Eickhoff (6–12) || — || 20,365 || 46–56
|- style="background:#fbb"
| 103 || July 27 || @ Marlins || 1–11 || Adam Conley (7–5) || Zach Eflin (3–4) || — || 32,403 || 46–57
|- style="background:#bfb"
| 104 || July 28 || @ Braves || 7–5 || Aaron Nola (6–9) || Matt Wisler (4–11) || Jeanmar Gómez (27) || 22,785 || 47–57
|- style="background:#fbb"
| 105 || July 29 || @ Braves || 1–2 || Tyrell Jenkins (1–2) || Vince Velasquez (8–3) || Jim Johnson (5) || 27,732 || 47–58
|- style="background:#bfb"
| 106 || July 30 || @ Braves || 9–5 || Jeremy Hellickson (8–7) || Julio Teherán (3–9) || — || 38,236 || 48–58
|- style="background:#fbb"
| 107 || July 31 || @ Braves || 1–2 || Mauricio Cabrera (2–0) || Andrew Bailey (3–1) || Jim Johnson (6) || 21,545 || 48–59
|-

|- style="background:#bfb"
| 108 || August 2 || Giants || 13–8 || Héctor Neris (4–3) || Will Smith (1–4) || — || 23,351 || 49–59
|- style="background:#bfb"
| 109 || August 3 || Giants || 5–4 (12) || Luis García (1–0) || George Kontos (2–2) || — || 23,162 || 50–59
|- style="background:#fbb"
| 110 || August 4 || Giants || 2–3 (10) || Sergio Romo (1–0) || Severino González (0–2) || Santiago Casilla (25) || 30,229 || 50–60
|- style="background:#bfb"
| 111 || August 5 || @ Padres || 5–4 || Jeremy Hellickson (9–7) || Christian Friedrich (4–7) || Jeanmar Gómez (28) || 27,521 || 51–60
|- style="background:#fbb"
| 112 || August 6 || @ Padres || 7–9 || Buddy Baumann (1–0) || Jake Thompson (0–1) || — || 37,453 || 51–61
|- style="background:#bfb"
| 113 || August 7 || @ Padres || 6–5 || Jerad Eickhoff (7–12) || Brad Hand (3–3) || Jeanmar Gómez (29) || 32,710 || 52–61
|- style="background:#fbb"
| 114 || August 8 || @ Dodgers || 4–9 || Julio Urías (2–2) || Zach Eflin (3–5) || — || 48,370 || 52–62
|- style="background:#fbb"
| 115 || August 9 || @ Dodgers || 3–9 || Kenta Maeda (11–7) || Vince Velasquez (8–4) || — || 42,859 || 52–63
|- style="background:#bfb"
| 116 || August 10 || @ Dodgers || 6–2 || Elvis Araújo (2–1) || Scott Kazmir (9–6) || — || 41,098 || 53–63
|- style="background:#bfb"
| 117 || August 12 || Rockies || 10–6 || Jake Thompson (1–1) || Jon Gray (8–6) || — || 23,600 || 54–63
|- style="background:#bfb"
| 118 || August 13 || Rockies || 6–3 || Jerad Eickhoff (8–12) || Tyler Anderson (4–4) || Jeanmar Gómez (30) || 23,203 || 55–63
|- style="background:#bfb"
| 119 || August 14 || Rockies || 7–6 || Severino González (1–2) || Tyler Chatwood (10–8) || Jeanmar Gómez (31) || 20,068 || 56–63
|- style="background:#fbb"
| 120 || August 16 || Dodgers || 5–15 || Kenta Maeda (12–7) || Vince Velasquez (8–5) || — || 28,118 || 56–64
|- style="background:#fbb"
| 121 || August 17 || Dodgers || 2–7 || Scott Kazmir (10–6) || Jake Thompson (1–2) || — || 21,137 || 56–65
|- style="background:#bfb"
| 122 || August 18 || Dodgers || 5–4 || Michael Mariot (1–0) || Grant Dayton (0–1) || Jeanmar Gómez (32) || 29,187 || 57–65
|- style="background:#fbb"
| 123 || August 19 || Cardinals || 3–4 (11) || Seung-hwan Oh (3–2) || Frank Herrmann (0–1) || Alex Reyes (1) || 20,627 || 57–66
|- style="background:#bfb"
| 124 || August 20 || Cardinals || 4–2 || Jeremy Hellickson (10–7) || Luke Weaver (0–1) || Jeanmar Gómez (33) || 32,338 || 58–66
|- style="background:#fbb"
| 125 || August 21 || Cardinals || 0–9 || Mike Leake (9–9) || Vince Velasquez (8–6) || — || 20,127 || 58–67
|- style="background:#fbb"
| 126 || August 23 || @ White Sox || 1–9 || Carlos Rodon (4–8) || Jake Thompson (1–3) || — || 18,843 || 58–68
|- style="background:#bfb"
| 127 || August 24 || @ White Sox || 5–3 || Jerad Eickhoff (9–12) || James Shields (5–16) || Jeanmar Gómez (34) || 15,630 || 59–68
|- style="background:#fbb"
| 128 || August 26 || @ Mets || 4–9 || Bartolo Colón (12–7) || Adam Morgan (1–8) || — || 31,111 || 59–69
|- style="background:#fbb"
| 129 || August 27 || @ Mets || 1–12 || Noah Syndergaard (12–7) || Jeremy Hellickson (10–8) || — || 35,832 || 59–70
|- style="background:#bfb"
| 130 || August 28 || @ Mets || 5–1 || David Hernandez (3–3) || Robert Gsellman (1–1) || — || 32,033 || 60–70
|- style="background:#fbb"
| 131 || August 29 || Nationals || 0–4 || Tanner Roark (14–7) || Jake Thompson (1–4) || — || 16,056 || 60–71
|- style="background:#fbb"
| 132 || August 30 || Nationals || 2–3 || Max Scherzer (15–7) || Jerad Eickhoff (9–13) || Mark Melancon (37) || 16,378 || 60–72
|- style="background:#fbb"
| 133 || August 31 || Nationals || 1–2 || Gio González (10–9) || Adam Morgan (1–9) || Shawn Kelley (7) || 16,503 || 60–73
|-

|- style="background:#fbb"
| 134 || September 2 || Braves || 4–8 || Mauricio Cabrera (3–0) || Jeanmar Gómez (3–3) || — || 17,175 || 60–74
|- style="background:#fbb"
| 135 || September 3 || Braves || 4–6 (10) || Jed Bradley (1–0) || Edubray Ramos (1–2) || Mauricio Cabrera (4) || 19,453 || 60–75
|- style="background:#fbb"
| 136 || September 4 || Braves || 0–2 || Julio Teherán (5–9) || Jake Thompson (1–5) || Jim Johnson (15) || 21,322 || 60–76
|- style="background:#bfb"
| 137 || September 5 || @ Marlins || 6–2 || Jerad Eickhoff (10–13) || Jake Esch (0–1) || — || 20,849 || 61–76
|- style="background:#bfb"
| 138 || September 6 || @ Marlins || 4–3 || Adam Morgan (2–9) || José Ureña (3–6) || Jeanmar Gómez (35) || 16,169 || 62–76
|- style="background:#fbb"
| 139 || September 7 || @ Marlins || 0–6 || Andrew Cashner (5–11) || Jeremy Hellickson (10–9) || — || 16,592 || 62–77
|- style="background:#bfb"
| 140 || September 8 || @ Nationals || 4–1 || Alec Asher (1–0) || A. J. Cole (1–2) || Jeanmar Gómez (36) || 25,412 || 63–77
|- style="background:#fbb"
| 141 || September 9 || @ Nationals || 4–5 || Mark Melancon (2–1) || Frank Herrmann (0–2) || — || 28,469 || 63–78
|- style="background:#fbb"
| 142 || September 10 || @ Nationals || 0–3 || Shawn Kelley (2–2) || Luis García (1–1) || Mark Melancon (40) || 36,152 || 63–79
|- style="background:#fbb"
| 143 || September 11 || @ Nationals || 2–3 || Gio González (11–9) || Adam Morgan (2–10) || Mark Melancon (41) || 31,805 || 63–80
|- style="background:#bfb"
| 144 || September 12 || Pirates || 6–2 || Jeremy Hellickson (11–9) || Gerrit Cole (7–10) || — || 15,514 || 64–80
|- style="background:#fbb"
| 145 || September 13 || Pirates || 3–5 || Rivero (1–4) || Jeanmar Gómez (3–4) || Tony Watson (12) || 16,190 || 64–81
|- style="background:#bfb"
| 146 || September 14 || Pirates || 6–2 || Jake Thompson (2–5) || Steven Brault (0–3) || Jeanmar Gómez (37) || 16,112 || 65–81
|- style="background:#fbb"
| 147 || September 15 || Pirates || 2–15 || Chad Kuhl (4–3) || Jerad Eickhoff (10–14) || — || 15,247 || 65–82
|- style="background:#bfb"
| 148 || September 16 || Marlins || 4–3 (13) || Frank Herrmann (1–2) || A. J. Ramos (1–3) || — || 18,179 || 66–82
|- style="background:#bfb"
| 149 || September 17 || Marlins || 8–0 || Jeremy Hellickson (12–9) || José Ureña (4–7) || — || 24,597 || 67–82
|- style="background:#fbb"
| 150 || September 18 || Marlins || 4–5 || Mike Dunn (4–1) || Héctor Neris (4–4) || A. J. Ramos (37) || 20,059 || 67–83
|- style="background:#bfb"
| 151 || September 20 || White Sox || 7–6 || Jake Thompson (3–5) || James Shields (5–18) || Michael Mariot (1) || 16,096 || 68–83
|- style="background:#bfb"
| 152 || September 21 || White Sox || 8–3 || Jerad Eickhoff (11–14) || Chris Sale (16–9) || — || 21,703 || 69–83
|- style="background:#fbb"
| 153 || September 22 || @ Mets || 8–9 (11)  || Jim Henderson (2–2)  || Edubray Ramos (1–3) || — || 35,759 || 69–84
|- style="background:#fbb"
| 154 || September 23 || @ Mets || 5–10 || Josh Smoker (3–0) || Jeremy Hellickson (12–10) || Hansel Robles (1) || 37,873 || 69–85
|- style="background:#bfb"
| 155 || September 24 || @ Mets || 10–8 || Alec Asher (2–0) || Sean Gilmartin (0–1) || Michael Mariot (2) || 39,995 || 70–85
|- style="background:#fbb"
| 156 || September 25 || @ Mets || 0–17 || Robert Gsellman (3–2) || Jake Thompson (3–6) || — || 35,093 || 70–86
|- style="background:#fbb"
| 157 || September 27 || @ Braves || 6–7 || Mauricio Cabrera (4–1) || David Hernandez (3–4) || Jim Johnson (18) || 22,348 || 70–87
|- style="background:#fbb"
| 158 || September 28 || @ Braves || 2–12 || Mike Foltynewicz (9–5) || Adam Morgan (2–11) || — || 22,104 || 70–88
|- style="background:#fbb"
| 159 || September 29 || @ Braves || 2–5 || Mauricio Cabrera (5–1) || Jeanmar Gómez (3–5) || — || 32,121 || 70–89
|- style="background:#fbb"
| 160 || September 30 || Mets || 1–5 || Robert Gsellman (4–2) || Alec Asher (2–1) || — || 20,556 || 70–90
|-

|- style="background:#fbb"
| 161 || October 1 || Mets || 3–5 || Bartolo Colón (15–8) || Patrick Schuster (0–1) || Jeurys Familia (51) || 20,225 || 70–91
|- style="background:#bfb"
| 162 || October 2 || Mets || 5–2 || Colton Murray (1–1) || Erik Goeddel (2–2) || Héctor Neris (2) || 36,935 || 71–91
|-

Roster
All players who made an appearance for the Phillies during 2016 are included.

Farm system

External links
 2016 Philadelphia Phillies season at Baseball Reference
 Philadelphia Phillies' official website

References

Philadelphia Phillies seasons
Philadelphia Phillies
Philadelphia Phillies